Baconia festiva is a species of clown beetle in the family Histeridae. It is found in South America.

References 

Histeridae
Beetles described in 1891